Marco Brighi (born 5 February 1983) is an Italian footballer who plays for S.P. La Fiorita as a central midfielder.

Career
After beginning his career with Rimini, Brighi was signed by Juventus in the summer of 2002. He was loaned to Serie C1 and Serie C2 clubs before being signed permanently by Bellaria Igea Marina.

In the 2010–11 season, Marco Brighi played for A.C. Rimini 1912. The team's predecessor, Rimini Calcio, didn't register the team for the new season in Serie Lega Pro Prima Divisione, and so the new team, refounded as A.C. Rimini 1912, restarted to play in the Serie D division. The club's new president, Biagio Amati, created the new team with players of high level, and Marco Brighi was chosen to be the captain of this team.

Personal life
Marco is one of four brother's who all play football; his older brother, Matteo, is also a professional footballer.

References

External links
 
 

Italian footballers
Rimini F.C. 1912 players
Juventus F.C. players
S.S.D. Lucchese 1905 players
Vis Pesaro dal 1898 players
A.S.D. Calcio Ivrea players
A.C. Bellaria Igea Marina players
Sportspeople from Rimini
1983 births
Living people
Association football midfielders
Footballers from Emilia-Romagna